The following is a list of notable deaths in December 2007.

Entries for each day are listed alphabetically by surname. A typical entry lists information in the following sequence:
 Name, age, country of citizenship at birth, subsequent country of citizenship (if applicable), reason for notability, cause of death (if known), and reference.

December 2007

1
Rassim al-Jumaili, 69, Iraqi actor and comedian, kidney failure.
Jennifer Davidson, 38, American executive, senior vice president of programming and scheduling for Cartoon Network.
Elisabeth Eybers, 92, South African-born poet.
Tony Fall, 67, British rally driver and Opel Motorsport Team director, heart attack.
Ken McGregor, 78, Australian tennis player, stomach cancer.
Danny Newman, 88, American publicist for the Lyric Opera of Chicago, pulmonary fibrosis.
Anton Rodgers, 74, British actor.

2
Jennifer Alexander, 35, Canadian-born American ballet dancer, traffic collision. 
Robert O. Anderson, 90, American founder and former CEO of ARCO.
Nelly Beltrán, 82, Argentine actress.
Elizabeth Hardwick, 91, American co-founder of The New York Review of Books.
Doreen Kartinyeri, 72, Ngarrindjeri elder and historian.
David Maybury-Lewis, 78, British anthropologist.
Eleonora Rossi Drago, 82, Italian actress, cerebral haemorrhage.
Les Shannon, 81, English football player (Liverpool, Burnley) and manager (Bury, Blackpool).
Thomas F. Torrance, 94, Scottish theologian.

3
Art Arfons, 81, American jet-car driver and drag racer, three-time world land speed record holder.
John Belgrave, 67, New Zealand public servant, Chief Ombudsman (2003–2007), cancer.
Jaime Fuster, 66, Puerto Rican politician and jurist, Resident Commissioner (1985–1992), heart attack.
Susumu Katsumata, 63, Japanese manga artist and illustrator, melanoma.
James Kemsley, 59, Australian cartoonist (Ginger Meggs), motor neurone disease.
Keshav Meshram, 70, Indian writer and critic, lung cancer.
Lord Bloody Wog Rolo, 62, Australian activist, renal cell carcinoma.
Heloneida Studart, 76, Brazilian writer, essayist, playwright, journalist, advocate for women's rights, and political figure.

4
Chad "Pimp C" Butler, 33, American rap artist (UGK), sleep apnea and accidental overdose.
Jake Gaudaur, 87, Canadian Commissioner of the Canadian Football League (1968–1984), cancer.
Jay H. Gordon, 77, American politician, Vermont Auditor of Accounts (1965–1969), smoke inhalation.
Stanley McArdle, 85, British admiral.
Norval Morrisseau, 75, Canadian Ojibwe artist, founder of the Woodlands Style, Parkinson's disease.
Chip Reese, 56, American professional poker player, heart attack.
Herman Rose, 98, American cityscape painter, cancer.
Carlos Valdes, 81, Cuban conga player, respiratory failure.

5
M. V. Dhond, 93, Indian literary and art critic.
Christine Finn, 78, English actress.
Robin Gloag, 64, British co-founder of Stagecoach Group, traffic collision.
Arnold Hardy, 85, American Pulitzer Prize-winning photographer, complications from hip surgery.
Robert A. Hawkins, 19, American mass murderer, suicide by gunshot.
Andrew Imbrie, 86, American composer.
Dan Iosif, 57, Romanian revolutionary, lung cancer.
Jillian Kesner-Graver, 58, American actress (Happy Days), Orson Welles historian, staph infection.
Alois Kracher, 48, Austrian winemaker, pancreatic cancer.
Peter Orton, 64, English television producer, cancer.
George Paraskevaides, 91, Cypriot businessman (Joannou & Paraskevaides) and philanthropist.
Karlheinz Stockhausen, 79, German composer.
Tony Tenser, 87, British film producer.
Harry Thomson Jones, 82, British racehorse trainer.
Rene Villanueva, 53, Filipino playwright and author, stroke.
John Winter, 83, Australian athlete, 1948 Olympics high jump gold medalist.

6
Wolfgang Assbrock, 55, German politician, member of the CDU and Landtag of North Rhine-Westphalia.
Mike Donkin, 56, British reporter and journalist (BBC News), cancer.
rudra kumar vasudev, 14, Irish model, suspected overdose.
Jacques Hébert, 84, Canadian politician, Senator (1983–1998).
John Hill, 95, British politician, Conservative MP for South Norfolk (1955–1974).
John Pilkington Hudson, 97, British horticulturist and bomb disposal expert.
Gennadi Kinko, 65, Soviet Estonian rower.
Murray Klein, 84, American businessman, co-owner of New York City's Zabar's food emporium, lung cancer.
Shelley Rohde, 74, British journalist and author.
Ken Southworth, 89, American animator (Scooby-Doo, Q. T. Hush, He-Man and the Masters of the Universe), stroke.
András Szöllősy, 86, Hungarian composer.

7
Noel Forster, 75, British artist.
Fuad Hassan, 78, Indonesian Minister of Education (1985–1993), cancer.
John Hollowbread, 73, British football goalkeeper (Tottenham Hotspur, Southampton).

8
Donald Burton, 73, British actor, husband of actress Carroll Baker, emphysema.
Ioan Fiscuteanu, 70, Romanian actor, colon cancer.
Dmitry Grigorieff, 89, American Episcopalian prelate, dean emeritus of Saint Nicholas Cathedral in Washington, D.C., cardiac arrest.
Roger King, 63, American TV executive (King World, CBS), developed Wheel of Fortune, Jeopardy! and The Oprah Winfrey Show, stroke.
Gerardo García Pimentel, 24, Mexican crime reporter, shot.
Al Scaduto, 79, American cartoonist (They'll Do It Every Time).

9
John Stuart Archer, 64, British chemical engineer and academic administrator.
István Borzsák, 92, Hungarian classical scholar.
Edward Dutkiewicz, 46, British artist.
Wayne Howard, 58, American comic book artist (Charlton Comics), heart attack.
Apichet Kittikorncharoen, 25, Thai singer, brain injury.
Jim Langley, 78, British footballer for England, Fulham, and QPR, heart attack.
Matthew J. Murray, 24, American spree killer, suicide by gunshot.
Elspeth Rostow, 90, American academic, University of Texas dean, widow of Walt Whitman Rostow, heart attack.
Kurt Schmied, 81, Austrian footballer, former member of the national team.
Thore Skogman, 76, Swedish musician, stroke. 
Rafael Sperafico, 26, Brazilian racing driver, race crash.
J. Fife Symington Jr., 97, American diplomat to Trinidad and Tobago, complications of old age.
Gordon Zahn, 84, American Catholic peace activist, co-founder of Pax Christi USA, complications of Alzheimer's disease.

10
Ashleigh Aston Moore, 26, American-born Canadian actress (Now and Then), accidental heroin overdose.
George Morris, 76, American football player (Georgia Tech, San Francisco 49ers), apparent heart attack.
Aqsa Parvez, 16, Canadian allegedly killed for refusing to wear hijab, strangled.
Jerry Ricks, 67, American blues guitarist.
James Roxburgh, 86, British prelate, Bishop of Barking.
Gordon Samuels, 84, Australian Governor of New South Wales (1996–2001).
Henrietta Yurchenko, 91, American folklorist.

11
Allan Berube, 61, American gay historian and writer, complications from stomach ulcers.
José Luis Calva, 38, Mexican writer, serial killer and cannibal, apparent suicide. 
Freddie Fields, 84, American Hollywood agent, producer and studio executive, lung cancer.
Pat Hannigan, 71, Canadian ice hockey player (Toronto Maple Leafs, New York Rangers, Philadelphia Flyers).
Christie Hennessy, 62, Irish singer and songwriter, cancer.
*Nicholas Kao Se Tseien, 110, Chinese supercentenarian, world's oldest Catholic priest.
Carl Ludwig, Archduke of Austria, 89, Austrian son of Emperor Charles I of Austria.
Ottomar Pinto, 76, Brazilian politician, Governor of Roraima (2004–2007), heart attack.
Tatsuzō Shimaoka, 88, Japanese potter, living national treasure, acute liver failure.
Terry Yates, 57, American biologist, discovered source of hantavirus, brain cancer.

12
Basuki, 51, Indonesian comedian.
Ted Corbitt, 88, American ultramarathon runner, respiratory complications.
Shawn Eckardt, 40, American bodyguard and businessman, conspired to assault Nancy Kerrigan, natural causes.
Josep Guinovart, 80, Spanish artist.
François al-Hajj, 54, Lebanese Army general, roadside bomb.
Márcio Montarroyos, 59, Brazilian jazz trumpeter, lung cancer.
Jim Nevill, 80, British police officer, former head of Scotland Yard anti-terrorist squad.
Alfons Maria Stickler, 97, Austrian prelate of the Roman Catholic Church.
Ike Turner, 76, American R&B musician and record producer, ex-husband of singer Tina Turner, cocaine overdose.
Schuster Vance, 47, American actor, cancer. 
Lee Vincent, 91, American bassist and radio personality (WILK), heart failure.
Yuli Vorontsov, 78, Russian diplomat, former ambassador to the United Nations and United States.

13
Philippe Clay, 80, French singer and actor.
Fuat Deniz, 40, Swedish-Assyrian sociologist, stabbed.
Wiggo Hanssen, 84, Norwegian Olympic speed skater.
Laura Huxley, 96, American musician and author, widow of Aldous Huxley, cancer.
Jan Jakub Kotík, 35, Czech artist and rock drummer, cancer.
Alain Payet, 60, French adult film director.
Robert Russin, 93, American sculptor.
Floyd Westerman, 71, American musician, actor (Dances With Wolves, Walker, Texas Ranger, Hidalgo) and Native American activist, leukemia.

14
Issam Al Zaim, 67, Syrian economist, former Minister of Industry, heart attack.
Hank Kaplan, 87, American boxing historian, cancer.
Maria Lauterbach, 20, American marine and murder victim.
Clarence Marshall, 82, American Major League Baseball pitcher (New York Yankees).
Frank Morgan, 73, American saxophonist.
Emory Sekaquaptewa, 78, American indigenous Hopi anthropologist.
Krishna Srinivas, 94, Indian poet and writer.
Jan Švéda, 76, Czech Olympic rower.

15
John Berg, 58, American actor, suicide by carbon monoxide poisoning.
Jean Bottéro, 93, French Assyriologist.
St. Clair Bourne, 64, American documentary filmmaker (Half Past Autumn), pulmonary embolism.
Julia Carson, 69, American member of the House of Representatives from Indiana since 1997, lung cancer.
Gerard Fairtlough, 77, British biochemist and entrepreneur.
Andrzeja Górska, 91, Polish nun, abbess of the Grey Ursulines.
Ryan Gracie, 33, Brazilian martial artist.
Clem Jones, 89, Australian Lord Mayor of Brisbane (1961–1975), pneumonia.
Matjaž Klopčič, 73, Slovenian film director.
Diane Middlebrook, 68, American biographer and poet, cancer.
Caetano N'Tchama, 52, Bissau-Guinean politician, Prime Minister (2000-2001).  
Giuseppe Rinaldi, 88, Italian actor and voice actor.
Tejeshwar Singh, 60, Indian publisher, newsreader and theatre activist, cardiac arrest.
Ace Vergel, 55, Filipino actor, cardiac arrest.
Jonathan Witchell, 33, British BBC reporter for Radio Kent.

16
Dan Fogelberg, 56, American singer-songwriter ("Same Old Lang Syne"), prostate cancer.
Harald Genzmer, 98, German composer of classical music.
Ismail Gulgee, 81, Pakistani painter, strangled.
Serge Vinçon, 58, French politician.

17
Don Chevrier, 69, Canadian sportscaster.
Joel Dorn, 65, American jazz, pop and R&B record producer, heart attack.
Jim Holstein, 77, American basketball player (Minneapolis Lakers).
Tom Murphy, 83, American politician, speaker of the Georgia House of Representatives (1973–2002), complications of a stroke.
Celestino Piatti, 85, Swiss graphic artist, painter and book designer.
Marnesba Tackett, 99, American civil rights activist.
Jack Zander, 99, American animator (Tom and Jerry).

18
Walter Bowart, 68, American co-founder of East Village Other, colon cancer.
Gerald Le Dain, 83, Canadian jurist, Justice of the Supreme Court.
Carl Graff-Wang, 64, Norwegian Olympic handball player.
Samuel Karlin, 83, American mathematician, heart attack.
Jack Linkletter, 70, American television host, son of Art Linkletter, lymphoma.
Motiur Rahman, 58, Indian politician, Rashtriya Janata Dal member of the Rajya Sabha since 2005, heart attack.
Bill Strauss, 60, American writer and satirist, founder of political comedy group Capitol Steps, pancreatic cancer.

19
Frank Capra, Jr., 73, American movie studio executive, son of director Frank Capra, prostate cancer.
James Costigan, 81, American actor and television writer (Eleanor and Franklin), heart failure.
Desmond C. Derbyshire, 83, British linguist.
John A. Garraty, 87, American historian, heart failure.
Albert L. O'Neil, 87, American politician, Boston City Council (1971–1999).

20
Tommy Byrne, 87, American baseball player.
Jeanne Carmen, 77, American actress and pin-up girl, lymphoma.
Arabella Churchill, 58, British founder of Children's World charity, granddaughter of Sir Winston Churchill, pancreatic cancer.
Russell Coffey, 109, American serviceman, one of three known remaining American veterans of World War I.
Lorne Davis, 77, Canadian ice hockey player (Montreal Canadiens) and scout (Edmonton Oilers).
Ted Finn, 68, Canadian intelligence official, director of CSIS (1984–1987).
John Gibbs, 90, British Anglican prelate, Bishop of Coventry (1976–1985).
Peer Hultberg, 72, Danish author and psychoanalyst.
Geoffrey Martin, 79, British historian and Keeper of the Public Records (1982–1988).
Lydia Mendoza, 91, American Tejano music singer and guitarist.
Raphaël Nguyễn Văn Diệp, 81, Vietnamese Roman Catholic prelate, coadjutor bishop of Vĩnh Long (1975–2007).
Robbie Williams, 45, Australian politician, first Indigenous Australian Brisbane City councillor, former ATSIC commissioner, heart attack.

21
Adolfas Akelaitis, 97, Lithuanian Olympic athlete.
Carol Bly, 77, American author and poet, ovarian cancer.
Kex Gorin, 56, British drummer (Magnum), kidney cancer.
Ken Hendricks, 66, American contractor and billionaire, fall from roof.
Hans Imhoff, 85, German businessman, founder of Imhoff Chocolate Museum in Cologne. 
Jack Lamabe, 71, American Major League Baseball pitcher.
Ken Lee, 75, Chinese-born Australian businessman, owner and co-founder of Bing Lee superstores, cancer.
Saadia Marciano, 57, Israeli Black Panthers leader, member of the Knesset.
Norton Nascimento, 45, Brazilian actor, heart failure.
Jeani Read, 60, Canadian journalist, cancer.
Battista Serioli, 107, Italian World War I veteran.

22
Joe Ames, 86, American singer (Ames Brothers), heart attack.
Philip Bednall, 76, Australian cricketer.
Chrysostomos I, 80, Cypriot prelate, Archbishop of Cyprus (1977–2006).
Sir Charles Court, 96, Australian politician, Premier of Western Australia (1974–1982).
Andy Davis, 80, American football player (Washington Redskins).
Sylvan Fox, 79, American journalist, complications from pneumonia.
Andrew Glyn, 64, British economist.
Julien Gracq, 97, French writer.
Lucien Teisseire, 88, French road bicycle racer.
Marvin Wachman, 90, American historian, President of Lincoln University and Temple University, heart failure.
Ruth Wallis, 87, American singer-songwriter, complications of Alzheimer's disease.
Takashi Yamamoto, 58, Japanese politician.

23
Dale Baird, 71, American thoroughbred horse trainer, traffic collision.
Donald Chant, 79, Canadian biologist and environmental advocate.
Evelyn Gandy, 87, American politician, Lieutenant Governor of Mississippi (1976–1980).
W.F. Ganong, 83, American neuroendocrinologist, prostate cancer.
Michael Kidd, 92, American film and stage choreographer, cancer.
Aloísio Lorscheider, 83, Brazilian Roman Catholic prelate and cardinal, heart failure.
Tyler MacDuff, 82, American actor.
Hans Mild, 73, Swedish footballer and ice hockey player.
Oscar Peterson, 82, Canadian jazz pianist, kidney failure and complications from a stroke.
Rhoda Pritzker, 93, American philanthropist, member of the Pritzker family.
Ferreira Queimado, 94, Portuguese former chairman of S.L. Benfica, after long illness.
Kevin Sinclair, 65, New Zealand-born Hong Kong reporter, editor and columnist for the South China Morning Post, cancer.
Osvaldo Reyes, 88, Chilean painter, stroke.
Frank Swaelen, 77, Belgian politician, former President of the Senate and Minister of State.

24
Jim Angel, 67, Australian radio newsreader, stroke.
Cláudio Camunguelo, 60, Brazilian composer and singer, diabetes.
Reinhard Heß, 62, German ski jumping coach, pancreatic cancer.
Wilhelmina Jashemski, 97, American archaeologist, renal failure.
Andreas Matzbacher, 25, Austrian cyclist, traffic collision.
Sir Nicholas Pumfrey, 56, British judge, stroke.
George Warrington, 55, American transportation official, President of Amtrak (1998–2002), pancreatic cancer.

25
Jim Beauchamp, 68, American Major League Baseball player and coach, leukemia.
Tommy Harmer, 79, British footballer (Tottenham Hotspur, Watford and Chelsea).
John Hayes, 80, New Zealand test cricketer.
Patricia Kirkwood, 86, British actress, Alzheimer's disease.
Hugh Massingberd, 60, British genealogist and journalist, former Daily Telegraph obituary editor.
*Mighty King Kong, 34, Kenyan reggae musician.
William MacDonald, 90, American Christian author.
Hans Otte, 81, German avant-garde composer and pianist.
G. P. Sippy, 93, Indian film producer and director.
Carlos Eduardo Sousa Jr., 17, American student, tiger attack.
Tatiana, 4, American-born Siberian tiger at San Francisco Zoo, mauled a visitor to death, shot.
Sir George Vallings, 75, British vice admiral, throat cancer.

26
Raúl Bernao, 66, Argentine footballer, hepatitis.
Sir Phillip Bridges, 85, British barrister and judge, Chief Justice of the Gambia.
Jim Castiglia, 89, American football and baseball player, natural causes.
Joe Dolan, 68, Irish singer and entertainer, brain haemorrhage.
Andrew Grima, 86, British jeweller.
Voitto Liukkonen, 67, Finnish sports commentator.
Paul D. MacLean, 94, American physician, developed triune brain concept, heart attack.
Nina Menshikova, 79, Russian actress.
Stu Nahan, 81, American sportscaster, lymphoma.
John Pappenheimer, 92, American physiologist, respiratory failure.

27
Kit Ahern, 92, Irish politician.
Ben D. Altamirano, 77, American politician, member of the New Mexico Senate since 1971, heart attack.
Ben Bamfuchile, 47, Zambian coach of the Namibia national football team, after short illness.
Benazir Bhutto, 54, Pakistani opposition leader and former prime minister (1988–1990, 1993–1996), assassinated.
Edward A. Brennan, 73, American businessman, former Chairman of Sears, Roebuck and Company.
Sir Howard Colvin, 88, British architectural historian.
Steven Florio, 58, American businessman, former CEO of Condé Nast, heart attack.
Jerzy Kawalerowicz, 85, Polish film director.
Jaan Kross, 87, Estonian writer.
Ed LaDou, 52, American pizza chef, popularized gourmet California-style pizzas, cancer.
Marie-Jeanne, 87, American ballet dancer, congestive heart failure
*Prince Pedro Gastão of Orléans-Braganza, 94, Brazilian pretender to the title Emperor of Brazil.
Peter Wing, 93, Canadian politician, mayor of Kamloops, North America's first mayor of Chinese descent, stroke.

28
Aidin Nikkhah Bahrami, 25, Iranian basketball player, traffic collision.
Jiří Pauer, 88, Czech composer, theatre director and academic.
Serigne Saliou Mbacké, 92, Senegalese religious leader, fifth caliph of the Mouride Islamic movement.
Amarnath Sehgal, 85, Indian sculptor.
*Sun Daolin, 86, Chinese actor.
Tab Thacker, 45, American wrestler and actor (Police Academy, City Heat, Wildcats), complications from diabetes.

29

Olayr Coan, 48, Brazilian actor and theater director, traffic collision. 
Phil Dusenberry, 71, American advertising executive, lung cancer.
Kevin Greening, 44, British former BBC Radio 1 disc jockey.
Vincent Gruppuso, 67, American businessman, founder of Kozy Shack puddings, complications from diabetes.
*Abdullah ibn Husayn al-Ahmar, 74, Yemeni politician, Parliamentary speaker since 1993, cancer.
Joan Ingpen, 91, British classical music manager (Ingpen & Williams), launched the career of Luciano Pavarotti.
Rex King-Clark, 94, British soldier and racing driver.
Robert Morris, 81, English cricketer.
Nonja, 55, Indonesian Sumatran orangutan thought to be world's oldest.
Phil O'Donnell, 35, Scottish footballer (Motherwell) with one Scotland cap, heart failure.
 Scott M. Robinson, 54, American key grip.
H. D. Thoreau, Jr., 84, American track-and-field authority and Olympics official, complications from Alzheimer's and stroke.
Shu Uemura, 79, Japanese makeup artist, pneumonia.

30
Bert Bolin, 82, Swedish meteorologist, stomach cancer.
Kinkri Devi, 82, Indian environmentalist.
Laila Kaland, 68, Norwegian politician, MP (1985–2001), after long illness.
Jorge Machiñena, 71, Uruguayan deputy (1985–2000), President of the Chamber (1996–1997), heart attack.
Leonard B. Meyer, 89, American musicologist.
Victor Navarra, 55, American coordinator for New York Marathon, cancer.
Doreen Norton, 85, British nursing pioneer.
Willie Robinson, 81, American blues singer, injuries from a fire.
Louis Wolfson, 95, American businessman, bred and raced 1978 U.S. Triple Crown champion Affirmed, colon cancer.

31
Alberto Alonso, 90, Cuban dancer and choreographer, heart attack.
Tommy Dickson, 78, British footballer (Linfield, Northern Ireland), after long illness.
Tony Elliott, 48, American football player (New Orleans Saints), natural causes.
Ralph Emmerson, 94, British Anglican prelate, Bishop of Knaresborough (1972–1979).
Michael Goldberg, 83, American abstract expressionist painter, heart attack.
Bill Idelson, 88, American actor and script writer, complications from a broken hip.
Kathryn Ish, 71, American television, voiceover and theater actress (Laverne & Shirley), cancer.
Milton L. Klein, 97, Canadian politician, MP for Cartier (1963–1968).
Markku Peltola, 51, Finnish actor and musician. 
Muhammad Osman Said, 85, Libyan Prime Minister (1960–1963).
Ettore Sottsass, 90, Italian designer, heart failure.

References 

2007-12
 12